Living in the 20th Century is the fourteenth studio album by American rock band Steve Miller Band. The album was released in November 1986, by Capitol Records. The song "I Want to Make the World Turn Around" spent six consecutive weeks at the top of the Album Rock Tracks chart in the U.S. at the end of 1986.

Track listing

Personnel
 Steve Miller – vocals, guitar, keyboards, Synclavier
 Kenny Lee Lewis – bass guitar, guitar
 Byron Allred – keyboards
 Gary Mallaber – drums, percussion

Additional personnel
 Gerald Johnson – bass guitar on tracks 6, 7, 8 & 9
 Kenny G – saxophone on track 2
 Greg Douglass – guitar on track 5
 James Cotton – harmonica on track 11
 Norton Buffalo – harmonica on tracks 10 & 11
 Lonnie Turner – bass guitar on track 5
 Les Dudek – dobro on track 11
 Charles Calimise – bass guitar on tracks 10 & 11
 Kenny Johnson – drums on tracks 10 & 11
 Waheem Young – piano on track 11

References

1986 albums
Steve Miller Band albums
Capitol Records albums